Davide Cali (born 1972) is a Swiss-born Italian writer of picture books and graphic novels, primarily for children and young adults. He lives in Italy. His work has been published in 25 countries and translated into many languages. He also writes under the pseudonyms Taro Miyazawa and Daikon.

Biography 
Even though he was born in Liestal, Switzerland, Davide Calì grew up in Italy where he started his career as a comic book artist working with many fanzines. In 1994 he took a job as a comics author at the iconic Italian comics magazine “Linus”. He held that position until 2008.

He started writing children's books in 1998, his first works were published in Italy. Since 2004 his books have been published in France either by Sarbacane and in the magazine “Mes premiers j'aime lire” (Bayard Editions).

Currently, his books amount to more than 90. They have been translated in over 30 languages.

Davide Calì has also taught illustration-related courses for many organisations - both in Italy and in Europe - such as IED Istituto Europeo di Design in Turin, Artielier in Padova, MiMaster in Milan and Estonian Academy of Arts in Tallinn.

He provided the idea for “Cari autori vediamoci chiaro”, a guide for those who want to become professional illustrators. It affords advice and suggestions from Davide Calì and other important Italian authors. In 2003 the book had been produced by Zoolibri/Delicatessen and given out for free.

His latest articles concerning illustration and children's books appeared on the website Frizzifrizzi and on Morena Forza's blog Robadadisegnatori. They are soon to be gathered in order to create a free-downloading guide.

He took part in a great number of exhibitions - either as an artist or a superintendent- in Paris and all around France and on the web. Many shows based on his works have been staged in France, Belgium, Italy and Japan.

Since 2016 he has been the art director at Book on a Tree, the storytelling agency that the Italian writer Pierdomenico Baccalario has founded in London, in 2014.

In 2020 it activated a series of reading promotion projects, carrying out online reading for a period. He also donated several projects free of charge to booksellers, teachers and librarians, including the Hula-Hoop Readings and Take-Away Writers (later also declined with illustrators and cartoonists).

Works

Album

Works originally published in Italian
 Storia di Alfonso e del suo cane Boris, illustrated by the author, 2000
 Mi piace il cioccolato (English translation: I love chocolate), illustrated by Evelyn Daviddi, Zoolibri, 2001
 Zaccaria cane parlante e altre storie di animali, illustrated by the author, 2002
 Il gatto verde, illustrated by the author, 2002
 La collezione di biscotti, illustrated by Evelynn Daviddi, Zoolibri, 2006
 Due eroi sono troppi, illustrated by Miguel Tanco, Arka, 2006
 Voglio una mamma-robot (English translation: Mama Robot), illustrated by Anna Laura Cantone, Arka, 2007
 Quel che vorrei, illustrated by Agnese Baruzzi, Einaudi Ragazzi, 2007
 L'orso con la spada (English translation: The Bear with the Sword), illustrated by Gianluca Foli, Zoolibri, 2008
 L'isola del piccolo mostro nero-nero, illustrated by Philip Giordano, Zoolibri, 2008
 Auto-futuro, illustrated by Maurizio Santucci, Zoolibri, 2011
 Raymond il bambino a rotelle, illustrated by Simone Frasca, Emme 2011
 La prossima volta!, illustrated by Gianni Peg, Emme, 2011
 Mondo fantastico, co-authors Federica Iacobelli, Vanessa Sorrentino, illustrated by Agnese Baruzzi, Carlotta Costanzi, Massimo Ottoni, Marco Paci, 2011
 Signor Alce, illustrated by Sara Welponer, Emme, 2012
 Io, Qinuq, illustrated by Leire Salaberria, Kite Edizioni, 2013
 Mio papà, il grande pirata, illustrated by Maurizio Quarello, Orecchio Acerbo, 2013
 Polline – Una storia d'amore, illustrated by Monica Barengo, Kite Edizioni, 2013
 Pum, Pum!, illustrated by Maddalena Gerli, Zoolibri, 2014
 Quando un elefante si innamora, illustrated by Alice Lotti, Kite Edizioni, 2014
 Un giorno, senza un perché, illustrated by Monica Barengo, Kite Edizioni, 2014
 Biancaneve e i 77 nani, illustrated by Raphaëlle Barbanègre, EDT Giralangolo, 2016
 La rapina del secolo, illustrated by the author, Biancoenero Edizioni, 2016
 La casa di riposo dei supereroi, illustrated by the author, Biancoenero Edizioni, 2016
 Il richiamo della palude, illustrated by Marco Somà, Kite Edizioni, 2016
 Inaugurazione del Poseidon, illustrated by Noemi Vola, Biancoenero Edizioni, 2017
 Quando un elefante mette su casa, illustrated by Alice Lotti, Kite Edizioni, 2017
 La dieta del pugile, illustrated by Noemi Vola, Biancoenero Edizioni, 2017
 Gianni Ginocchio e il segreto inconfessabile, illustrated by Laura Re, Lapis Edizioni, 2017
 Atlante dei Luoghi Immaginari, co-written by Pierdomenico Baccalario, illustrated by Isabella Mazzanti, Mondadori, 2017
 Mio nonno gigante, illustrated by Bruno Zocca, Biancoenero Edizioni, 2018
 L’orso che non aveva mai voglia di fare nulla, illustrated by Lali Limola, Eli Readers, 2018
 Il venditore di felicità, illustrated by Marco Somà, Kite Edizioni, 2018
 Tre in tutto, illustrated by Isabella Labate, Orecchio Acerbo, 2018
 Il perché degli spinaci, illustrated by Andrea Rivola, DeAgostini, 2018
 L’accademia dei supereroi, illustrated by the author, Biancoenero Edizioni, 2018
 Lo scrittore, illustrated by Monica Barengo, Kite Edizioni, 2019
 Dicono di me, illustrated by Marianna Balducci, Hop Edizioni, 2019
 Carlo Cucito e la fiera del fumetto, illustrated by Laura Re, Lapis Edizioni, 2019
 Ora o mai più, illustrated by Cecilia Ferri, Kite Edizioni, 2020
 Fino in fondo, illustrated by Anna Aparicio Català, Kite Edizioni, 2020
 Un tempo per ogni cosa, illustrated by Isabella Labate, Kite Edizioni, 2020
La gita dei supereroi, illustrated by Alice Piaggio, Biancoenero Edizioni, 2020
 Una storia senza cliché, illustrated by Anna Aparicio Català, Clichy Edizioni, 2021
 Settecani, illustrated by Alice Piaggio, Clichy Edizioni, 2021
 L'isola delle ombre, illustrated by Claudia Palmarucci, Orecchio Acerbo, 2021
 I supereroi e lo sciopero della minestrina, illustrated by Alice Piaggio, Biancoenero Edizioni, 2021
 Signor Alce, illustrated by Richolly Rosazza, Kite Edizioni, 2021
 Quando sarò grande, illustrated by Giulia Pastorino, Clichy Edizioni, 2021
 Troppi conigli, illustrated by Emanuele Benedetti, Kite Edizioni, 2021
 Plenilunio, illustrated by Loputyn, Hop Edizioni, 2021
 La principessa dei pony-unicorno, illustrated by Anna Aparicio Català, Clichy, 2022
 Salta!, illustrated by Adalgisa Masella, Kite, 2022
 E vissero felici e contenti, illustrated by Naida Mazzenga, Clichy, 2022
 L’album dei ricordi dei supereroi, illustrated by the author, Biancoenero, 2022  
 Osso, Pelliccia e Zucca non fanno paura a nessuno, illustrated by Stefano Martinuz, Nomos, 2022
 Colpa di chi?, illustrated by Regina Lukk-Toompere, Kite, 2022

Works originally published in Italian (Switzerland)
 La casa degli uccelli, illustrated by Tiziana Romanin, Marameo Edizioni, 2019

Works originally published in French
 Un papa sur mesure, (English translation: A Dad Who Measures Up), illustrated by Anna Laura Cantone, Sarbacane, 2004
 Juste a ce moment-là, illustrated by José Saraiva, Sarbacane, 2004
 Piano Piano, (English translation: Piano Piano), illustrated by Éric Heliot,Sarbacane, 2005
 Bernard et moi, illustrated by Éric Heliot, Sarbacane, 2005
 Moi, j'attends, (English translation: I Can't Wait), illustrated by Serge Bloch, Sarbacane, 2005
 La vie de chapeau, illustrated by Éric Heliot, Sarbacane, 2006
 Si je fusse une grenouille, illustrated by Benedicte Guettier, Sarbacane, 2006
 L'ennemi, (English translation: The Enemy), illustrated by Serge Bloch, Sarbacane, 2007
 Leopold, Chien de divan, illustrated by Camille Jourdy, Sarbacane, 2008
 J'aime t'embrasser, (English translation: I Love Kissing You), illustrated by Serge Bloch, Sarbacane, 2008
 La revanche des aubergines, illustrated by Éric Héliot, Sarbacane, 2009
 Marlène Baleine, illustrated by Sonja Bougaeva,  Sarbacane, 2009
 C'est quoi l'amour?, (English translation: What Is This Thing Called Love?), illustrated by Anna Laura Cantone, Sarbacane, 2011
 Monstres et légendes, (English translation: Monsters & Legends: Cyclops, Krakens, Mermaids and Other Imaginary Creatures That Really Existed!), illustrated by Gabriella Giandelli, Actes Sud Junior, 2011
 Coccinelles cherchent maison, (English translation:The Great House Hunt), illustrated by Marc Boutavant, Sarbacane, 2011
 Quand je ferme les jeux ..., illustrated by Robin, Sarbacane, 2011
 10 petits tanks s’en vont en guerre, (English translation: 10 tanks were going to the war), illustrated by the author, Editions Thierry Magnier, 2012
 Petit Inuit, (English translation: The Little Eskimo), illustrated by Maurizio Quarello, Sarbacane, 2012
 Bons baisers ratés de Paris, illustrated by Anne Rouquette, Gulf Stream, 2012
 Paris 2050, illustrated by Ale+Ale, Actes Sud, 2012
 Tendres bêtises à faire quand on est amoureux, illustrated by Robin, Sarbacane, 2013
 Un week-end de repos absolu, illustrated by Alexandra Huard, Sarbacane, 2013
 Les jours hibou, illustrated by Vincent Mathy, Sarbacane, 2013
 Le grand livre de la bagarre, illustrated by Serge Bloch, Sarbacane, 2013
 Elle est où la ligne, illustrated by Joelle Jolivet, Trimestre / Oskar, 2014
 Bons baisers ratés de Venise, illustrated by Isabella Mazzanti, Gulf Stream, 2014
 Vide-grenier, illustrated by Marie Dorleans, Sarbacane, 2014
 Le perroquet de l’Empereur, illustrated by Chiaki Miyamoto, Nobi-Nobi, 2014
 Il était trois fois: les trois petits cochons , illustrated by Roland Garrigue, Nathan, 2015
 Bons baisers ratés de New York , illustrated by Raphaëlle Barbanègre, Gulf Stream, 2015
 Chez moi, illustred by Sébastien Mourrain, Actes Sud, 2016
 Les Bacon Brothers: retour en Amérique!, illustrated by Ronan Badel, ABC Melody, 2016
 Crotte!, illustrated by Christine Roussey, Nathan, 2016
 Cours!, illustrated by Maurizio Quarello, Sarbacane, 2016
 Bronto-stégo-mégalo-saurus, illustrated by Sebastien Mourrain, Sarbacane, 2017
 Eléctrico 28, illustrated by Magali Lehuche ABC Melody, 2017
 Cornelius Holmes /1: Le caniche des Baskerville, illustrated by Océane Meklemberg, La Palissade, 2017
 La souris qui voulait faire une omelette, illustrated by Maria Dek, Helium, 2017
 Les amoureux, illustrated by Roland Garrigue, Sarbacane, 2018
 A chaque pied sa chaussure, illustrated by Cecilia Campironi, Cambourakis, 2018
 C’est le chat, illustrated by Magali Clavelet, Gallimard, 2018
 Monsieur Tomate, prof. de maths, illustrated by Popy Matigot, Sarbacane, 2018
 Il était trois fois: La belle au bois dormant, illustrated by Amélie Falière, Nathan, 2018
 Qui veut jouer avec moi?, illustrated by the author, Sarbacane, 2018
 Mon premier jour de classe, illustrated by Amélie Groux, Little Urban, 2018
 Top-car, illustrated by Sébastien Mourrain, Editions des éléphants, 2018
 Bimbim est très en colère, illustrated by Michiko Chapuis, Rue du Monde, 2018
 Bimbim veut qu’on lui obéisse, illustrated by Michiko Chapuis, Rue du Monde, 2018
 La Chanson perdue de Lola Pearl, illustrated by Ronan Badel, L'Élan vert, 2018
 Les Cacacrotte: le barbecue, illustrated by Laure du Fay, Amaterra, 2018
 Les Cacacrotte: le musée, illustrated by Laure du Fay, Amaterra, 2018
 4998 amis, illustrated by Michiko Chapuis, Rue du Monde, 2018
 Mon premier (vrai?) baiser?, illustrated by Amélie Groux, Little Urban, 2019
 Poussin, illustrated by Davide Merveille, Sarbacane, 2019
  Les jours des baleines, (as Cornelius), illustrated by Tommaso Carozzi, Editions Chocolat! Jeunesse, 2019
 Tyranno-petite-soeur, illustrated by Sébastien Mourrain, Sarbacane, 2019
 Mon premier démi-frère, illustrated by Amélie Groux, Little Urban, 2019
 Où finit le monde?, illustrated by Maria Dek, Hélium, 2020
 On nous appelait les mouches, illustrated by Maurizio Quarello, Sarbacane Editions, 2020
 Odette fait des claquettes, illustrated by Clothilde Delacroix, Sarbacane, 2020
 M. Tigre le magnifique, illustrated by Miguel Tanco, Gallimard Jeunesse Giboulées, 2020
 Votez le loup, illustrated by Magali Clavelet, Casterman, 2021
 Grands, méchants et pas contents, illustrated by Maurèen Poignonec, ABC Melody, 2021
 Drôle de nuage, illustrated by Sara Cunha, Bayard Jeunesse, 2021
 Un léger goût de mangue, illustrated by Marco Somà, Sarbacane, 2022  
 Bronto-mytho-papi, illustrated by Sébastien Mourrain, Sarbacane, 2022  
 En me proménant avec Kiki, illustrated by Paolo Domeniconi, Cambourakis, 2022  
 Mon petit papa, illustrated by Jean Jullien, Sarbacane, 2022  
 Une bibliothèque à trois roues, illustrated by Sébastien Pelon, ABC Melody, 2022  
 Vampire un jour, vampire toujours, illustrated by Sébastien Mourrain, Actes Sud, 2022  
 186 - Une histoire trop courte, illustrated by Marianna Balducci, Tundra Books, 2022

Works originally published in French (Canada)
 Petit pois, illustrated by Sébastien Mourrain, Comme des géants, 2016
 Le grand voyage de Petit Pois, illustrated by Sébastien Mourrain, Comme des Géants, 2017
 L'école de dessin de Petit Pois, illustrated by Sébastien Mourrain, Comme des géants, 2021

Works originally published in French (Belgium)
 Tourmaline, illustrated by Fatinha Ramos, De Eenhoorn, 2020

Works originally published in German
 Die Geschichte der Roten Nasen und der Roten Ohren, illustrated by Aurélie Guillerey, Annette Betz, 2007
 Omas unglaubliche Reise, illustrated by Anna Laura Cantone, Annette Betz,  2008

Works originally published in Spanish (Argentina)
 Spaghetti, illustrated by the author,  Pequeño Editor, 2008

Works originally published in Spanish
 Poseando con Kiki, illustrated by Paolo Domeniconi, Fragatina, 2018
 Hugo no puede dormir, illustrated by Anna Aparicio Català, Nube Ocho, 2020
 ¡Abajo Leroy!, illustrated by Guridi, Tres Tigres Tristes, 2021
 Superheroínas e superheroes - Manual de instrucións, illustrated by Gomez, Nube Ocho, 2022

Works originally published in Portuguese
 Um dia, um guarda-chuva, illustrated by Valerio Vidali, Planeta Tangerina, 2011
 A rainha das rãs não pode molhar os pés, illustrated by Marco Somà, Bruàa, 2012
 Arturo, photos by Ninamasina, Bruàa, 2012
 A casa que voou , illustrated by Catarina Sobral, Bruàa, 2015
 Pergunta ao teu pai, illustrated by Noemi Vola, Bruàa, 2019

Works originally published in English (USA)
 I didn’t do my homeworks because, illustrated by Benjamin Chaud, Chronicle Books, 2014
 A funny thing happened on the way to school, illustrated by Benjamin Chaud, Chronicle Books, 2015
 The truth about my unbelievable summer, illustrated by Benjamin Chaud, Chronicle Books, 2016 
 The Bacon Brothers: Back in the USA!, illustrated by Ronan Badel, ABC Melody, 2016
 A funny thing happened at the museum, illustrated by Benjamin Chaud, Chronicle Books, 2017
 George and the shadow, illustrated by Serge Bloch, Harper and Collins, 2017
 The truth about my unbelievable school, illustrated by Benjamin Chaud, Chronicle Books, 2018
 I hate my cats, illustrated by Anna Pirolli, Chronicle Books, 2018
 Good Morning, Neighbor, illustrated by Maria Dek, Princeton Architectural Press, 2018
 Grown-ups never do that, illustrated by Benjamin Chaud, Chronicle Books, 2019
 Where the World Ends, illustrated by Maria Dek, Princeton Architectural Press, 2020

Works originally published in English (Canada)
 Snow White and the 77 dwarfs, illustrated by Raphaëlle Barbanègre, Tundra Books, 2015
 Cinderella and the furry slippers, illustrated by Raphaëlle Barbanègre, Tundra Books, 2017 
 A great dog, illustrated by Miguel Tanco, Tundra Books, 2018

Works originally published in English (UK)
 The Birthday Crown , illustrated by Kate Slater, Royal Collection, 2016

Comics & graphic novels for adults
 Adam et Eve: le Paradis perdure, illustrated by Yannick Robert, Varoum, 2014
 Tutte le ossessioni di Victor, illustrated by Squaz (Pasquale Todisco), Diàbolo, 2015
 Maschi da evitare, illustrated by Veronica "Veci" Carratello, Hop! Edizioni, 2018

Comics & graphic novels for children
 Le costume de Père Noël, (English translation: Santa's Suit), illustrated by Éric Heliot, 2005 (France)
 Pas de crotte pour moi, illustrated by David De Thuin, 2006 (France)
 Il faut sauver le sapin Marcel, illustrated by Clothilde Perrin, 2008 (France)
 Jérôme et les formis rouges, illustrated by Juliette Boulard, 2010 (France)
 Mission Kraken! Les aventures de l'intrépide équipe O.C.E.A.N., illustrated by Vincent Bourgeau, 2011 (France)
 Super Potamo, illustrated by Raphaëlle Barbanègre, September 2013 (Spain)
 London Mystery Club (Book 1): Le loup-garou de Hyde Park, ABC Mélody (France), 2016
 Les ravencroft (Book 1): chaque chose à sa place, illustrated by Valentina Brancati, Kramiek (Switzerland), 2018
 London Mystery Club (Book 2): a mummy on the tube, illustrated by Yannick Robert, ABC Melody, 2018

The series of 10 Petits Insectes  (France) 
 10 petits insectes (Book 1), (English translation: 10 Little Insects), illustrated by Vincent Pianina, 2009
 10 petits insects dans le brouillard (Book 2), illustrated by Vincent Pianina, 2011
 10 petits insectes. Retour vers le passé (Book 3), illustrated by Vincent Pianina, 2013

The series of Cruelle Joëlle (France) 
 Cruelle Joëlle: la vie n'est pas si simple, Madame Mort! (Book 1), illustrated by Ninie, Sarbacane, 2010
 Cruelle Joëlle: week-end frisson au lac crystal! (Book 2), illustrated by Ninie, Sarbacane, 2012
 Cruelle Joëlle: une journee d'enfer (Book 3), illustrated by Ninie, Sarbacane, 2013

Novels

Works originally published in French
 L'amour? C'est mathématique!, Sarbacane, 2013
 3 tyrans + 1 bolosse = quelle vie!, Sarbacane, 2014
 Elle est où la ligne, illustrated by Joelle Jolivet, Trimestre / Oskar, 2015

Works originally published in Italian
 La linea che separa le cose, illustrated by Alessandro Baronciani, Mondadori, 2022
 I bambini di Baltimore House, illustrated by Riccardo Renzi, Pelledoca, 2022

Adults novels
 Feeling bed, illustrated by Virginia Mori, Hop Edizioni, 2020

APP
 A ciascuno il suo, developed by: Paramecio Studio, Kite Edizioni, 2012
 Moi, j’attends, developed by: France Televisions Distribution SA,© Les films d'ici 2, la Station Animation, les éditions Sarbacane, 2013

Multimedia
 Pandaroux, Lunii, 2019 
 Les jours hibou,  illustrated by Vincent Mathy, Piboco, 2019

Board games
 Crossroads, with Elisabetta Maria Zocca, Ludic, 2022

Translations
 Pour aimer son tigre, A2Mimo, 2019

Theatre Adaptations

 Moi, j’attends, Compagnie O’Navio Théâtre, 2010 (Limoges, France)
 L’ennemi, Compagnie Art tout Chaud, 2010 (Amiens, France)
 L’ennemi, MicMac Théâtre, 2010 (Belgique)
 Pouce! (from L'Ennemi), Compagnie Marche ou rêve, 2010 (Toulouse, France)
 Mon Père le grand pirate, Compagnie Marche ou rêve, 2014 (Toulouse, France)
 Duplex, (from Le double + Elle est où la ligne?), Compagnie Théâtre de l’Éclaircie, 2019 (Dijon, France)

Awards 
 Eurochocolate Award, Italy, 2001 
 Prix Libbylit, best album Moi, j’attends, Salon du Livre de Jeunesse de Namur, Belgium, 2005
 Prix Baobab, best album Moi, j’attends, Salon du livre de Jeunesse de Montreuil, France, 2005
 Premio Words and Music, Menzione speciale per Piano piano, Fiera di Bologna, Italy, 2006
 Prix Suisse Enfantaisies, Piano piano, Losanna, Switzerland, 2006
 Prix SNCF, Moi, j’attends, Festival du livre de jeunesse de Rouen, France, 2006
 Selezione White Ravens, Voglio una mamma robot, Germany, 2008
 Selezione White Ravens, L’orso con la spada, Germany, 2009
 Selezione CJ Picture Book Awards, L’orso con la spada, Korea, 2009
 Prix Bernard Versele, L’Ennemi, Brussels,  Belgium, 2009
 Chinatimes, Best Album for Kids, L’Ennemi, Taiwan, 2009
 Selection Notable Social Studies Trade Books for Young People, The Enemy, USA, 2010
 Selection White Ravens, Marlène Baleine, Germany, 2011
 Primer Libro Kirico, Malena Ballena, Spain, 2011
 Prix littéraire du cycle 2 de la médiathèque de Bagneux, Marlène Baleine, France, 2011
 Prix des Bulles de Haute des Garonne, 10 Petits Insectes, France, 2011
 Prix littéraire de Plessis Robinson, L’Ennemi, France, 2011
 Prix Tam Tam, 10 Petits Insectes, La Courneuve, France, 2011
 Prix Tatoulu, Marlène Baleine, France, 2011
 Prix des Incorruptibles, Marlène Baleine, France, 2011
 Selection CJ Picture Book Awards, Um dia un guarda-chuva, Korea, 2011
 Prix DLire Canalblog, Cruelle Joëlle, France, 2011
 Prix Bulles en Haute Garonne, Jerôme et les Fourmis rouges, 2012
 Prix de la bande dessinée jeunesse de Montreuil-Bellay, Cruelle Joëlle, France, 2012
 Prix Littéraire des écoles de Châtenay-Malabry, Marlène Baleine, France, 2012
 Prix des ados, Salon du Livre Midi-Pyrénées, L’amour? C’est mathématique! France, 2014
 Premio Cassa di Risparmio di Cento, Mio padre, il grande pirata, Italy, 2014
 Premio Orbil, Mio padre, il grande pirata, Italia, 2014
 Prix du Livre jeunesse Marseille, Le grand livre de la bagarre, France, 2014
 Selezione White Ravens, Quando un elefante si innamora, Germany, 2014
 Premio Il gigante delle Langhe, La regina delle rane, Italy, 2015 
 Prix des enfants Salon de Saint-Orens, Elle où la ligne?, 2015
 Premio Soligatto (sezione 8-11 anni), Mio padre, il grande pirata, Italy, 2015
 Prix Bernard Versele, L’amour? C’est Mathématique!, Belgium, 2015 
 Prix de la foire de Wroclaw, L’Ennemi, Poland, 2015
 Prix Boscarato, Miglior Sceneggiatura, Tutte le ossessioni di Victor, Italy, 2015
 Prix Laura Orvieto, Mio padre, il grande pirata, Italy, 2015
 Prix Bernard Versele, L’amour ? C’est mathématique !, Belgique, 2015
 Prix Soligatto, Sono arrivato in ritardo a scuola perché, Italy, 2016
 Prix Festival du livre Jeunesse de Annemasse, Selection Lecteurs Juniors, L'amour c’est mathématique!, France, 2016
 Prix Michel Tournier Jeunesse (Catégorie Cadet), Les Bacon Brothers, France, 2018
 Prix Michel Tournier Jeunesse (Catégorie Cadet), Les Bacon Brothers, France, 2018
 Prix Littéraire de la Citoyenneté (cycle 3), Cours!, France, 2018
 Prix Alizé (Niveau 6e-5e) bibliothèques de Vienne, Cours!, France, 2018
 Prix Nénuphar de l’album jeunesse, Cours!, France, 2018
 Prix Chronos Vacances, Eléctrico 28, France, 2018
 Prix Kilitou, Eléctrico 28, France, 2018
 Premio Orbil, Tre in tutto, Italy, 2019
 Prix des Petits Caractères, Poussin, France, 2019
 Premio Legambiente, Tre in tutto, Italy, 2019
 Prix Danielle Grondein (Prix Spécial du jury), Journées du livre jeunesse de la ville Les Pennes-Mirabeau, La chanson perdue de Lola Pearl, France, 2019
 Prix Enfantaisie, Poussin, Switzerland, 2020
 Premio Torre del Agua, Il venditore di Felicità, Spain, 2021
 Premio Kimi Siegel, Il venditore di Felicità, Germany, 2021
 Finaliste Prix des libraires du Québec - catégorie Hors Québec - Jeunesse, M. Tigre le magnifique, avec Miguel Tanco, 2022
 Sélection Prix Sorcières, Catégorie Carrément sorcières fiction, Le Cauchemar du Thylacine, avec Claudia Palmarucci, 2022 
 Premio Luigi Malerba, Quando sarò grande, Italy, 2022
 Prix Versele, Les adultes ne font jamais ça, Belgio, 2022
 Best Illustrated Children Book, The writer, USA, 2022

References

External links
 Davide Cali (personal website)

Italian children's writers
Italian graphic novelists
Living people
1972 births
Italian male novelists
People from Liestal